Francisco Espinosa may refer to:

 Francisco Espinosa (cyclist) (born 1962), Spanish racing cyclist
 Francisco Espinosa (racing driver) (1947–2001), Argentine racing driver